Jana Hlaváčová (born 26 March 1938 in Prague) is a Czech actress. She starred in the film Operace Silver A under director Jiří Strach in 2007.

References

External links

1938 births
Living people
Czech film actresses
Czech stage actresses
Czech television actresses
Actresses from Prague
Academy of Performing Arts in Prague alumni
Czech voice actresses
20th-century Czech actresses
21st-century Czech actresses
Recipients of the Thalia Award